was a king of the Ryukyu Kingdom of the First Shō dynasty.

Shō Kinpuku succeeded his nephew, Shō Shitatsu, in 1449. The dam was built from Naha harbor to Tomari harbor, connecting many tiny isles.

King Shō Kinpuku died in 1453, a succession dispute erupted between the king's son  and his younger brother . Shuri Castle was burned down in the conflict, and both of them died in the incident. After the incident, the king's other younger brother, Shō Taikyū, came to the throne.

References

Chūzan Seifu (中山世譜)

Kings of Ryūkyū
First Shō dynasty
1398 births
1453 deaths